The 1957 Davis Cup was the 46th edition of the Davis Cup, the most important tournament between national teams in men's tennis. 24 teams entered the Europe Zone, 7 teams entered the America Zone, and 5 teams entered the Eastern Zone. Malaya, Lebanon and Venezuela made their first appearances in the competition.

The United States defeated Brazil in the America Zone final, the Philippines defeated Japan in the Eastern Zone final, and Belgium defeated Italy in the Europe Zone final. In the Inter-Zonal Zone, the United States defeated the Philippines in the semifinal and then defeated Belgium in the final. In the Challenge Round the United States were defeated by defending champions Australia. The final was played at the Kooyong Stadium in Melbourne, Australia on 26–28 December.

America Zone

Draw

Final
United States vs. Brazil

Eastern Zone

Draw

Final
Philippines vs. Japan

Europe Zone

Draw

Final
Belgium vs. Italy

Inter-Zonal Zone

Draw

Semifinals
United States vs. Philippines

Final
United States vs. Belgium

Challenge Round
Australia vs. United States

References

External links
Davis Cup official website

 
Davis Cups by year
Davis Cup
Davis Cup
Davis Cup
Davis Cup